The John A. Coate House is a historic house located in Grove Hill, Alabama.

Description and history 
The one-story, spraddle-roof house was built in 1855. It was listed as a landmark due to its architectural significance as a part of the Clarke County Multiple Property Submission.

It was added to the National Register of Historic Places on July 28, 1999.

References

National Register of Historic Places in Clarke County, Alabama
Houses on the National Register of Historic Places in Alabama
Houses completed in 1855
Houses in Clarke County, Alabama